The 2014–15 Lithuanian Handball League season is the 26th season of the Lithuanian Handball League, the top level handball in Lithuania. Ten teams participated in the league. League started at 27 September 2014 and will finish on 16 May 2015.

Regular season

Playoffs

The final match was watched by 1.300 spectators in Švyturys Arena.

References

External links
 Official website

2014–15 domestic handball leagues
2014 in Lithuanian sport
2015 in Lithuanian sport
Lithuanian Handball League seasons